Feđa or Fedja is a South Slavic male given name, which is a variant of the Russian name Fyodor, derived from the Greek name Theodoro, meaning "gift of god". Feđa is the common form in Serbia and Bosnia. The name may refer to:

Fedja Anzelewsky (1919–2010), German art historian
Feđa Stojanović (1948–2021), Serbian actor
Feđa Dudić (born 1983), Bosnian footballer
Feđa Isović (born 1965), Bosnian writer
Fedja Marušič (born 1971), Slovene slalom canoer 
Fedja Stefanov, Bulgarian sprint canoer
Fedja van Huêt (born 1973), Dutch actor

References

Bosnian masculine given names
Slavic masculine given names